The Zahiri school (or Dhāhirī) madhhab or al-Ẓāhirīyyah is a Sunnī school of Islamic jurisprudence founded by Dāwūd al-Ẓāhirī in the 9th century CE. It is characterized by strict adherence to literalism and reliance on the outward (ẓāhir) meaning of expressions in the Quran and ḥadīth literature; the consensus  (ijmāʿ) of the first generation of Muhammad's closest companions (ṣaḥāba), for sources of Islamic law (sharīʿa); and rejection of analogical deduction (qiyās) although Iman Zahiri sometimes accepted Qiyas al Jely and usually not accept societal custom or knowledge (urf), used by other schools of Islamic jurisprudence.
The school has also accepted Religious inference as valid.

After a limited success and decline in the Middle East, the Ẓāhirī school flourished in the Caliphate of Córdoba (Al-Andalus, today's Spain and Portugal), particularly under the leadership of Ibn Hazm, whose book Al-Muhalla is considered to be adiwalu al fiqhi dhahiri (the reference point for the Ẓāhirī school). It is variously said to have "survived for about 500 years in various forms" before being "merged with the Ḥanbalī school", but also to have been revived in the mid-20th century in some regions of the Muslim world.

Whereas some analysts describe Ẓāhirism as a distinct school of Islam, others have characterized it as a fifth school of thought (madhhab) within the Sunnī branch of Islam, and still retains a measure of influence and is recognized by contemporary Muslim scholars. In particular, members of the Ahl-i Hadith movement have identified themselves with the Ẓāhirī school of thought.

History

Emergence

While those outside the school of thought often point to Dawud al-Zahiri (815–883/4 CE) as the "founder" of the school, followers of the school themselves tend to look to earlier figures such as Sufyan al-Thawri and Ishaq Ibn Rahwayh as the forerunners of Ẓāhirī principles. Umm al-Qura University professor Abdul Aziz al-Harbi has argued that the first generation of Muslims followed the school's methods and therefore it can be called "the school of the first generation."

The Ẓāhirī school was initially called the Dawudi school after Dawud al-Ẓāhirī himself and attracted many adherents, although they felt free to criticize his views, in line with the school's rejection of taqlid. Alongside the Hanbalis, Zahiris constituted one of the major groups that originated from the Ahl al-Hadith school; which advocated the superiority of Qur'an and Sunnah in legal jurisdiction and denied the validity of Aql (logic) as an independent source of law. By the end of the 10th century, members of the madhhab were appointed as qadis in Baghdad, Shiraz, Isfahan, Firuzabad, Ramla, Damascus, Fustat, and Bukhara.

Westward expansion
Parallel to the school's development in the east, Ẓāhirī ideas were introduced to North Africa by theologians of the Maliki school who were engaged in lively debates with the Hanafi school, and to the Iberian Peninsula by one of Dawud al-Ẓāhirī's direct students. Unlike Abbasid lands, where the Ẓāhirī school developed in parallel and in opposition to other madhhabs (chiefly Hanafi, Shafi‘i, and Hanbali), in the West it only had to contend with its Maliki counterpart, which enjoyed official support of the Umayyad rulers. Starting in the late 9th century CE, an increasing number of "hir" scholars emerged in various regions of the Iberian peninsula, but none of their works have survived.

It was not until the rise of the Almohads that the Ẓāhirī school enjoyed official state sponsorship. While not all of the Almohad political leaders were Ẓāhirīs, a large plurality of them were not only adherents but were well-versed theologians in their own right. Additionally, all Almohad leaders – both the religiously learned and the laymen – were extremely hostile toward the Malikis, giving the Ẓāhirīs and in a few cases the Shafi‘is free rein to author works and run the judiciary. In the late 12th century, any religious material written by non-Ẓāhirīs was at first banned and later burned in the empire under the Almohad reforms.

Decline

The Ẓāhirī school enjoyed its widest expansion and prestige in the fourth Islamic century, especially through the works of Ibn al-Mughallis, but in the fifth century it lost ground to the Hanbalite school. Even after the Zahiri school became extinct in Baghdad, it continued to have some followers in Shiraz. Ẓāhirism maintained its prestige in Syria until 788 A.H. and had an even longer and deeper impact in Egypt. In the 14th century C.E., the Zahiri Revolt marked both a brief rekindling of interest in the school's ideas as well as affirmation of its status as a non-mainstream ideology. Al-Muhalla, a Medieval manual on Ẓāhirī jurisprudence, served in part as inspiration for the revolt and as a primary source of the school's positions. However, soon afterwards the school ceased to function and in the 14th century Ibn Khaldun considered it to be extinct. With the Reconquista and the loss of Iberia to Christian rule, most works of Ẓāhirī law and legal theory were lost as well, with the school only being carried on by individual scholars, once again on the periphery.

Wael Hallaq has argued that the rejection of qiyas (analogical reasoning) in Ẓāhirī methodology led to exclusion of the school from the Sunni juridical consensus and ultimately its extinction in the pre-modern era. Christopher Melchert suggests that the association of the Ẓāhirī school with Mu'tazilite theology, its difficulty in attracting the right patronage, and its reliance on outmoded methods of teaching have all contributed to its decline.

Modern history
In the modern era, the Ẓāhirī school has been described as "somewhat influential", though "not formally operating today". While the school does not comprise a majority of any part of the Muslim world, there are communities of Ẓāhirīs in existence, usually due to the presence of Ẓāhirī scholars of Islamic law. In particular, adherents of the modern-day Ahl-i Hadith movement in India and Pakistan have self-consciously emulated the ideas of the Ẓāhirī school and identified themselves with it. Modernist revival of the general critique by Ibn Hazm – the school's most prominent representative – of Islamic legal theory among Muslim academics has seen several key moments in recent Arab intellectual history, including Ahmad Shakir's republishing of Al-Muhalla, Muhammad Abu Zahra's biography of Ibn Hazm, and the republishing of archived epistles on Ẓāhirī legal theory by Sa'id al-Afghani in 1960 and Ihsan Abbas between 1980 and 1983. In 2004 the Amman Message recognized the Ẓāhirī school as legitimate, although it did not include it among Sunni madhhabs, and the school also received recognition from Sudan's former Islamist Prime Minister, Sadiq al-Mahdi. The literalist school of thought represented by the Ẓāhirī madhhab remains prominent among many scholars and laymen associated with the Salafi movement, and traces of it can be found in the modern-day Salafi movement. The school experienced a revival in the Islamic State.

Principles
Of the utmost importance to the school is an underlying principle attributed to the founder Dawud ibn 'Ali; who had robustly denounced the delicacies and ambiguities in Fiqh sciences. According to Dawud, the validity of religious issues is only upheld by certainty, and that speculation cannot lead to the truth. This certainty is to be determined by the outward or literal (Zahir) meaning of the Qurʾān and Hadith. Most Ẓāhirī principles return to this overarching maxim. Japanese Islamic scholar Kojiro Nakamura defines the Ẓāhirī schools as resting on two presumptions. The first is that if it were possible to draw more general conclusions from the strict reading of the sources of Islamic law, then God certainly would have expressed these conclusions already; thus, all that is necessary lies in the text. The second is that for man to seek the motive behind the commandments of God is not only a fruitless endeavor but a presumptuous one. Another major characteristic was their fierce condemnation of Qiyas (analogical reasoning) as a heresy and distortion of Sharia (Islamic law).

The Ẓāhirī school of thought generally recognizes three sources of Islamic law within the principles of Islamic jurisprudence.  The first is the Qur'an, considered by Muslims to be the verbatim word of God (Arabic: الله Allah); the second consists of the prophetic as given in historically verifiable reports, which consist of the sayings and actions of the Islamic prophet Muhammad; the third is absolute consensus of the Muslim community.

Certain followers of the Ẓāhirī school include religious inference as a fourth source of Islamic law.

The school differs from the more prolific schools of Islamic thought in that it restricts valid consensus in jurisprudence to the consensus of the first generation of Muslims who lived alongside Muhammad only. While Abu Hanifa and Ahmad ibn Hanbal agreed with them in this, most followers of the Hanafi and Hanbali schools generally do not, nor do the other two Sunni schools.

Additionally, the Ẓāhirī school does not accept analogical reasoning as a source of Islamic law, nor do they accept the practice of juristic discretion, pointing to a verse in the Qur'an which declares that nothing has been neglected in the Muslim scriptures. While al-Shafi‘i and followers of his school agree with the Ẓāhirīs in rejecting the latter, all other Sunni schools accept the former, though at varying levels.

Distinct rulings
Some followers of the Ẓāhirī school differ with the majority in that they consider the Virgin Mary to have been a female prophet.
Riba, or interest, on hand-to-hand exchanges of gold, silver, dates, salt, wheat and barley are prohibited per the prophet Muhammad's injunction, but analogical reasoning is not used to extend that injunction to other agricultural produce as is the case with other schools. The Ẓāhirīs are joined in this by early scholars such as Tawus ibn Kaysan and Qatadah.
Admission in an Islamic court of law is seen as indivisible by Ẓāhirīs, meaning that a party cannot accept some aspects of the opposing party's testimony and not other parts. The Ẓāhirīs are opposed by the Hanafi and Maliki schools, though a majority of Hanbalites share the Ẓāhirī position.
 Another example of the ignoring of analogical reasoning by Ẓāhirīs and how it separates that school from most madhhab, is their attitude towards dogs. Pious Muslims commonly avoid dogs, arguing  the hadith -- "If a dog drinks from your bowl then you must wash it seven times" --  indicate that dogs are unclean on the grounds that there is no other  reason for thoroughly cleaning what dogs have used.  Ẓāhirīs, in contrast, maintain that (in the words of one adherent), "if the prophet meant 'the dog is an unclean animal', ... he would have said 'the dog is an unclean animal'" but Iljma is accepted on most issues so this would be rejected by Zahiri madhab nowadays.

Reception
Like its founder Dawud, the Ẓāhirī school has been controversial since its inception. Due to their some so-called rejection of intellectual principles considered staples of other strains within Sunni Islam, adherents to the school have been described as displaying non-conformist attitudes.

Views on the Ẓāhirī within Sunni Islam
The Ẓāhirī school has often been criticized by other schools within Sunni Islam. While this is true of all schools, relations between the Hanafis, Shafi‘is and Malikis have warmed to each other over the centuries; this has not always been the case with the Ẓāhirīs.

Not surprisingly given the conflict over al-Andalus, Maliki scholars have often expressed negative feelings regarding the Ẓāhirī school. Abu Bakr ibn al-Arabi, whose father was a Ẓāhirī, nevertheless considered Ẓāhirī law to be absurd. Ibn 'Abd al-Barr, himself a former Ẓāhirī, excluded Dawud al-Ẓāhirī along with Ahmad ibn Hanbal from his book on Sunni Islam's greatest jurists, though Ignác Goldziher has suggested that Ibn Abdul-Barr remained Ẓāhirī privately and outwardly manifested Maliki ideas due to prevailing pressures at the time. At least with al-Ballūṭī, one example of a Ẓāhirī jurist applying Maliki law due to official enforcement is known. Ẓāhirīs such as Ibn Hazm were challenged and attacked by Maliki jurists after their deaths.

Followers of the Shafi‘i school within Sunni Islam have historically been involved in intellectual conflict with Ẓāhirīs. This may be due to Al-Shafi'i being a major proponent of the principle of Qiyas; rejected by the Zahiris.

Hanbali scholar Ibn al-Qayyim, while himself a critic of the Ẓāhirī outlook, defended the school's legitimacy in Islam, stating rhetorically that their only sin was "following the book of their Lord and example of their Prophet."

Zahirism and Sufism
The relationship between Ẓāhirism and Sufism has been complicated. Throughout the school's history, its adherents have always included both Sufis as well as harsh critics of Sufism. Many practitioners of Sufism, which often emphasizes detachment from the material world, have been attracted to the Ẓāhirī combination of strict ritualism and lack of emphasis on dogmatics.

Zahiris
Discerning who exactly is an adherent to the Ẓāhirī school of thought can be difficult. Harbi has claimed that most Muslim scholars who practiced independent reasoning and based their judgment only on the Qur'an and Sunnah, or Muslim prophetic tradition, were Ẓāhirīs. Followers of other schools of thought may have adopted certain viewpoints of the Ẓāhirīs, holding Ẓāhirī leanings without actually adopting the Ẓāhirī school; often, these individuals were erroneously referred to as Ẓāhirīs despite contrary evidence.

Additionally, historians would often refer to any individual who praised the Ẓāhirīs as being from them. Sufi mystic Ibn Arabi has most often been referred to as a Ẓāhirī because of a commentary on one of Ibn Hazm's works, despite having stated twice that he isn't a follower of the Ẓāhirī school or any other school of thought. Similarly, Muhammad ibn Jarir al-Tabari would include Ẓāhirī opinions when comparing differing views of Sunni Muslims, yet he founded a distinct school of his own. The case of Muslim figures who have mixed between different schools have proven to be more problematic. Muhammad Nasiruddin al-Albani, for example, referred to himself as a Ẓāhirī when pressed on the matter. When Ibn Hazm listed the most important leaders of the school, he listed known Ẓāhirīs Abdullah bin Qasim, al-Balluti, Ibn al-Mughallis, al-Dibaji and Ruwaym, but then also mentioned Abu Bakr al-Khallal, who despite his Ẓāhirī leanings is almost universally recognized as a Hanbalite.

Imam Bukhari 
Scott Lucas states "The most controversial aspect of al-Bukhari's legal principles is his disapproval of qiyas" and "A modern study of personal status laws in the Arab world by Jamal J. Nasir contains one sentence that explicitly mentions that the Ẓāhirīs and al-Bukhari rejected qiyas..."

Lucas also points out that the legal methodology of Bukhari is very similar to that of Ibn Hazm.

Followers of the Ẓāhirī school

Abd Allah al-Qaysi (died 885), responsible for spreading the school in Spain.
Abu l-'Abbās "Ibn Shirshīr" Al-Nāshī Al-Akbar (died 906 CE), prominent kalām theologian and teacher of Niftawayh.
Muhammad bin Dawud al-Zahiri (died 909), son of the school's namesake.
Ibn Abi Asim (died 909), early scholar of hadith.
Ruwaym (died 915), spiritual pioneer from the second generation of Sufism.
Niftawayh (died 935), student of the school's namesake and teacher of his son.
Ibn al-Mughallis (died 936), credited with popularizing the school across the Muslim world.
Al-Masudi (died 956), early Muslim historian and geographer.
Mundhir bin Sa'īd al-Ballūṭī (died 966), early judge in Spain for the Caliphate of Córdoba.
Al-Qassab (died 970), Muslim warrior-scholar.
Ibn Khafif (died 982), early mystic from the third generation of Sufism.
Ibn Hazm (died 1064), Andalusian polymath, author of numerous works.
Al-Humaydī (died 1095), hadith scholar, historian and biographer in Spain and then Iraq.
Ibn al-Qaisarani (died 1113), responsible for canonizing the six hadith books of Sunni Islam.
Ibn Tumart (died 1130), founder of the Almohad Empire
Abd al-Mu'min (died 1163), first Almohad Caliph.
Abu Yaqub Yusuf (died 1184), second Almohad Caliph, memorized Sahih al-Bukhari and Sahih Muslim.
Ibn Maḍāʾ (died 1196), Andalusian judge and linguist, and an early champion of language education reform.
Abu Yusuf Yaqub al-Mansur (died 1199), third Almohad Caliph, authored his own collection of hadith.
Muhammad al-Nasir (died 1213), fourth Almohad Caliph.
Idris I al-Ma'mun (died 1232), renegade who issued a challenge for the Almohad throne.
Ibn Dihya al-Kalby (died 1235), hadith scholar from Spain and then Egypt.
Abu al-Abbas al-Nabati (died 1239), Andalusian botanist, pharmacist and theologian.
Abu Bakr Ibn Sayyid al-Nās (died 1261), Andalusian-Tunisian scholar of hadith.
Fatḥ al-Din Ibn Sayyid al-Nās (died 1334), Andalusian-Egyptian biographer of the prophet Muhammad.
Abu Hayyan Al Gharnati (died 1344), Andalusian linguist and Qur'anic exegete.
Al-Maqrizi (died 1442), Egyptian historian, especially of the Fatimid Caliphate.

Contemporary followers of the school
Hasan al-Hudaybi (died 1973), Second General Guide of the Muslim Brotherhood and Islamic author. 
Muhammad Taqi-ud-Din al-Hilali (died 1987), translated the Qur'an, former prayer leader at Islam's two holiest mosques and professor at multiple universities.
Sa'id al-Afghani (died 1997), former Arabic language professor at Damascus University, correspondent member of the Academy of the Arabic Language in Cairo and proponent of language education reform.
Abu Turab al-Zahiri (died 2002), Indian-born Saudi Arabian linguist, jurist, theologian and journalist.
Ihsan Abbas (died 2003), Palestinian scholar of Arabic and Islamic studies, widely considered to be at the forefront of both fields during the 20th century.
Abu Abd al-Rahman Ibn Aqil al-Zahiri (living), Saudi Arabian polymath and correspondent member of the Academy of the Arabic Language in Cairo.
Muhammad Abu Khubza (died 2020), Moroccan polymath, authored the library catalog for the Bibliothèque générale et Archives.
Abdul Aziz al-Harbi (living), professor of Qur'anic exegesis at Umm al-Qura University.
Hassan al-Kattani (living), Moroccan preacher, having been convicted of inspiring the 2003 Casablanca bombings, was pardoned in 2011 after several hunger strikes and criticisms from human rights groups who alleged that Kattani was innocent.
Abū 'Abd ur-Rahmān al-Misrī (living), a Muhaddith from Jordan 
Dr. Muhammad Ibrāhīm Ibn Tamīm Al-Rayhān (living), a well known Kuwaiti Dhāhirī scholar 
Yahya al-Bahrumi (1983-2017), an American Islamist jihadi
Musa Cerantonio (living), an Australian Islamist

References

 
Sunni Islam
Madhhab
Ibn Hazm
Sunni Islamic branches